Edwin R. Fissinger (June 15, 1920, Chicago, Illinois – October 16, 1990, Fargo, North Dakota) was an American composer, conductor, scholar, and charter member of the ACDA.

Early years 
Edwin Russell Fissinger was the fifth of nine children born to Paul and Isabel Fissinger in Chicago, Illinois.

He grew up in Rockford, Illinois, and attended Rockford High School where he was a star athlete of the track team and ran the fastest 440 in the school's history. It was also in Rockford where Fissinger received his early musical training.

In the fall of 1938, Fissinger entered Marquette University, Milwaukee on a track scholarship. During his freshman year he became engrossed in popular music to such an extent that he opted not to return to college the following year in order to concentrate on music.

In 1939 he reorganized “Eddie Fissinger’s Orchestra” for which he served as pianist and arranger, writing original compositions and arrangements for the group. Fissinger also sang and played the piano for his local radio program at WROK in Rockford, “The Voice of Ed Fissinger.” In 1940, he joined the Charlie Agnew Orchestra. For the next two years he traveled as a singer, pianist, and arranger.

In 1941 he enlisted in the Air Force. Married singer Patty Morgan February 27, 1943. In 1944, after a brief tour with the Seventh Air Force in the Central Pacific, Fissinger became the first World War II veteran to enter the American Conservatory of Music in Chicago. There he received both his bachelor’s and master’s degrees. He specialized in composition and studied under eminent composer, Leo Sowerby. He earned his doctorate from the University of Illinois in 1965, where, in addition to studies in music literature and conducting, he studied musicology with Dragan Plamenac. His thesis title: "Selected Choral Works of Antonio Caldara."

Career 
Fissinger’s career began at the American Conservatory of Music where he was director of the choir and instructor from 1947 to 1954. He then was a graduate assistant in music theory at the University of Illinois from 1954 to 1957. From 1957 until coming to North Dakota State University in 1967 he was chairman of the music department and director of the choir and madrigal singers at the University of Illinois at Chicago Circle.

At North Dakota State University, Fissinger was chairman of the music department and served as the director of the Concert Choir and Madrigal Singers. In 1970, under his guidance, music department earned accreditation from the National Association of Schools of Music. Fissinger was also instrumental in the construction of the $6 million Music Education Center, dedicated in 1982.

Not only was Fissinger nationally recognized as a composer, he was a respected editor of choral music as well. From 1958 to 1962 he was consulting editor for Summary-Birchard Publishing Co. Beginning in 1967, he was editor of the Parkway Choral Series of contemporary choral music for World Library Publications.

In 1973, 1977, and 1983 the NDSU Concert Choir, under his direction, was selected to perform at the opening session of the National Convention of the American Choral Directors Association.

In 1977 Fissinger received the NDSU Blue Key Doctor of Service award.

He retired in 1985 and continued composing until his death in Fargo on October 16, 1990.

Compositional style 
Fissinger’s compositional focus was on choral music, the medium in which he was actively involved as a conductor from 1947 to 1985. Fissinger’s music is primarily a cappella with limited accompaniment.

References 

American male composers
1920 births
1990 deaths
20th-century American composers
20th-century American male musicians
American choral conductors
American male conductors (music)
20th-century American conductors (music)
Musicians from Chicago
Musicians from Rockford, Illinois
Classical musicians from Illinois
American Conservatory of Music alumni
University of Illinois alumni
University of Illinois Chicago faculty
North Dakota State University faculty
United States Army Air Forces personnel of World War II